Angela D. Dillard is an American scholar and author. She wrote Faith in the City: Preaching Radical Social Change in Detroit religion and political radicalism in Detroit from the 1930s to the 1960s. She also wrote Guess who's coming to dinner now?, a critical study of conservative political thought among African Americans, Latinos, women and homosexuals. She is Associate Dean for Undergraduate Education at the University of Michigan's College of Literature, Science and the Arts and was an associate professor of history and politics at New York University's Gallatin School of Individualized Study. She was writing a political biography of James H. Meredith. According to her profile at the University of Michigan she is writing Civil Rights Conservatism about connections and cooperation between the post-WWII civil rights movement and the rise of the "New Right". She has published work in The New York Times, The Washington Post, Dissent, and the Chronicle of Higher Education and has appeared as a guest on television and radio programs.

Dillard has a PhD in American Culture from the University of Michigan, an
MA from the University of Michigan in American Culture, an MA from the New School for Social Research in Political Theory, and a BA she earned from James Madison College and Michigan State University in Justice, Morality, Constitutional Democracy.

As well as being an Associate Dean, she is the Earl Lewis Collegiate Professor of Afroamerican and African Studies. Her work specializes in American and African-American intellectual history including issues of race, religion, and politics.

Guess who's coming to dinner
Scott L. Malcomson reviewed Guess who's coming to dinner? for The New York Times Book Review and described it as timely after the election of George W. Bush as U.S. president and his efforts to maintain a diverse cabinet and staff of Conservatives.

Bibliography
Faith in the City: Preaching Radical Social Change in Detroit, U of Michigan Press, 2007
Guess Who’s Coming to Dinner Now?: Multicultural Conservatism in America (NYU, 2001)
"Adventures in conservative feminism", Society, March 2005, Volume 42, Issue 3, pp 25–27,

References

External links
List of her publications with descriptions and a couple reviews on the University of Michigan website

American non-fiction writers
University of Michigan alumni
New York University faculty
Michigan State University alumni
Living people
Year of birth missing (living people)